is a Japanese announcer and news anchor for NHK.

Early years

Born and raised in Kakogawa, Hyogo Prefecture, Japan, Takase graduated from Waseda University. He belonged to a glee club as an undergraduate.

Career

Takase was hired by NHK in April 1999, and started his career at NHK Niigata Branch.

In April 2008, Takase was moved to Tokyo Announcement Room and appointed as a biweekly newscaster of NHK's morning news show NHK News Ohayō Nippon, where he starred from 4:30 to 5:55 am until March 2010. He also hosted Gekkan Toretate My Video from April 2009 to March 2010. From April 2010 to March 2011, he was involved in reporting from Diet.

In April 2011, Takase joined NHK News 7 as an assistant newscaster, starring on weekends until April 2012. He then became a newsreader for the news program aired at noon. In May 2015, he also presented at News Shibu Goji as a newsreader. From April 2016 to April 2017, he was an anchor of NHK News 7 for the weekend.

In April 2017, Takase was appointed the main presenter for NHK News Ohayō Nippon, where he anchored with Mayuko Wakuda and Maho Kuwako.

On February 9, 2022, NHK announced that Takase was supposed to step down from the job of the anchor of NHK News Ohayō Nippon together with Kuwako in April. He will host the evening program News Live! Yu Goji from April.

Personal life

When Takase worked for NHK Niigata Branch, he met and married Misaki Kawano, who was an announcer for Television Niigata Network.

References

External links
 Kozo Takase, Tokyo Announcement Room
 Takase Kozo

|-

|-

1975 births
Living people
Waseda University alumni
Japanese announcers
Japanese television personalities
Japanese television presenters
People from Kakogawa, Hyōgo